William E. Powell (born February 5, 1934) is an American politician and attorney in the state of Florida.

Powell was born in New York. He attended Siena College, and was a land surveyor. He served in the Florida House of Representatives from 1967 to 1972, representing district 74. He is a member of the Republican party.

References

Living people
1934 births
Republican Party members of the Florida House of Representatives
Politicians from Troy, New York
People from Indialantic, Florida